Joseph Boulnois (28 January 1884 – 20 October 1918) was a French organist and composer.

Biography
Boulnois attended the Conservatoire de Paris, where he studied counterpoint with Georges Caussade and organ with Louis Vierne. In 1906, he married the pianist Jane Chevalier, and they had a son the following year, Michel Boulnois, who also became a composer and organist.

In 1909, he was singing conductor at the Opéra-Comique. He remained very active as a soloist, notably as co-founder with Marc de Ranse, of the Concerts spirituels de Saint-Louis d'Antin. He also played in the Opéra-Comique and performed in the  church in the 14th arrondissement.

After the beginning of the First World War, Boulnois was mobilised at the Février Hospital of Châlons-sur-Marne, where he was a nurse from 1 January 1915. Appointed a corporal on 26 March 1915, he became a sergeant on 19 October 1916.

During this period, Boulnois produced his most important works: the Sonate pour piano, the Suite en 5 parties for cello and piano, and the Trio for violin, cello and piano.

Having contracted the 1918 flu pandemic, Boulnois was hospitalised on 15 October 1918. He died five days later, three weeks before the Armistice of 11 November 1918.

Prizes
 1901: 1st merit certificate in harmony (class of Antoine Taudou)
 1905: First Prize of organ (class of Alexandre Guilmant)
 1908: Second Prize in fugue (class of Charles Lenepveu)
 1910: First Prize of accompaniment for piano (class of Paul Vidal)

Principal works

Orchestra
 Sonate pour piano et petit orchestre
 Rhapsodie
 Marine
 Symphonie funèbre (unfinished)
 La Toussaint (1903), orchestration by Édouard Mignan (1919)

Piano
 Menuet pastoral
 Choral en fa dièse mineur
 La Toussaint (1903)
 Madrigal
 Pavane
 Scherzino
 Gigue
 Toccata, dedicated to his wife Jane Chevalier
 La Basilique (1918)
 Sonate (1918)
 Sainte Cécile au milieu d'un grand concert des anges (1918)

Organ
 Quatre pièces brèves en ré (1912)

Chamber music
 Quatuor à cordes (1916)
 Sonate pour violon et piano
 Sonate pour violoncelle piano, dedicated to Gérard Hekking (1917)
 Suite en cinq parties for piano and cello (1918)
 Trio pour piano, violon et violoncelle (1918)
 Noël, pour violon et piano
 Hiver, Neige, Noël, suite for cello and piano
 Hymne à Bacchus, for cello
 Jeux, for cello and piano
 Musette et Bidon, suite for cello
 Perdus dans un rêve, for cello and piano

Mélodies
 Pastorale, on a poem by Maurice Rollinat (1908)
 Accompagnement, poem by A. Samoin (1912)
 , poem by Marceline Desbordes-Valmore (1915)
 Nous n'irons plus au bois, poem by Théodore de Banville (1915)
 Souvenir, poem by André Chénier (1916)
 La Flûte, poem by André Chénier (1916)
 Recueillement, poem by Charles Baudelaire (1916)
 Trois sonnets, poem by Charles-Augustin Sainte-Beuve (1917)
 L'Ascension, poem by Sainte-Beuve (1917)
 La Mort des Amants, poem by Maurice Rollinat
 La Biche, poem by Maurice Rollinat, (Senart, 1923)
 L’Angelus, poem by P. Courrière, 1912 (Senart, 1923)
 La Cornemuse, poem by Maurice Rollinat, (1910), (Senart, 1923)

Stage music
 L'Anneau d'Isis, lyrical drama in 5 acts (1912)

References

External links
 Joseph Boulnois on Musica et Memoria detailed biography.
 Joseph Boulnois on France Musique
 
 Joseph Boulnois on Gallica
 Joseph Boulnois, Paraphrase symphonique sur l'Alleluia de la dédicace de Saint Michel (1914) on YouTube

1884 births
1918 deaths
19th-century French male musicians
20th-century French male musicians
20th-century organists
Conservatoire de Paris alumni
Deaths from Spanish flu
French classical organists
French Romantic composers
French male organists
People from Oise
French military personnel killed in World War I
French Army soldiers
Male classical organists